This is a list of large or well-known interstate or international companies headquartered in the Seattle metropolitan area.

, the Seattle metropolitan area is home to ten Fortune 500 companies: Internet retailer Amazon (#2), Costco Wholesale (#12), Microsoft (#15), coffee chain Starbucks (#125), Paccar (#159), clothing merchant Nordstrom (#289), Weyerhaeuser (#387), Expeditors International (#299), Alaska Airlines (#459) and Expedia (#500).

Biotechnology
 Alder Biopharmaceuticals (Bothell)
 Dendreon – immunotherapeutics  (defunct)
 Juno Therapeutics
 Seattle Genetics (Bothell)
 ZymoGenetics – therapeutic protein
 NanoString Technologies – Life Sciences Tools

Computer hardware

 Cray Inc. – supercomputers
 EMC Isilon – computer storage
 F5 Networks – application delivery controllers

Conglomerates
 Vulcan Inc. – investment vehicle for Paul Allen

Consulting
 Alvarez and Marsal – management consulting, turnaround management and performance improvement
 Avanade – business and technology consulting and information technology consulting
 Slalom Consulting – management consulting and information technology consulting

Design
ClearSign Combustion

Financial
Gravity Payments
Moss Adams
Russell Investments
Seattle Credit Union
Washington Federal Savings

Food and beverage
American Seafoods – management company for fishing vessels in the Bering Sea
Beecher's Handmade Cheese
Caffe Vita Coffee Roasting Company – coffee retailer
Crowd Cow – online meat delivery marketplace
Darigold – dairy agricultural marketing cooperative
Jones Soda – soft drink maker
MOD Pizza – pizza restaurant chain
Pagliacci Pizza – pizza restaurant chain
Seattle's Best Coffee
Starbucks – coffee retailer and coffeehouse chain
Theo Chocolate – organic and fair trade chocolate manufacturer
Trident Seafoods – management company for fishing vessels in the Bering Sea
Tully's Coffee – coffee retailer and wholesaler
Uwajimaya – Asian supermarket

Healthcare
 CellNetix
 Center for Global Infectious Disease Research
 Emeritus Senior Living
 Fred Hutchinson Cancer Research Center
 Northwest Kidney Centers
 PATH
 The Polyclinic 
 Providence Health and Services
Remote Medical International 
 Ventec Life Systems

Insurance
PEMCO – auto, home, boat, and life insurance
Safeco – property insurance
Trupanion – pet insurance

Intellectual property
 Getty Images – stock photography
 Intellectual Ventures – patent assertion hedge fund

Internet
 Allrecipes.com – online recipe service and forum
 Amazon – retail
 Avvo – legal services search
 BuddyTV – TV news, second screen technology (Business closed)
 Cheezburger – operates many humor web blogs such as I Can Has Cheezburger? and FAIL Blog
 Classmates.com –  social networking service
 eNotes.com – educational resource service
 ExtraHop Networks – cloud security analytics
 F5 Networks – application delivery controllers
 findwell – online real estate brokerage
 Groundspeak – operators of Geocaching.com
 Leafly – cannabis information 
 Onvia – government business intelligence portal
 Panopto – video content management
 PayScale – global employee compensation database
 Penny Arcade – webcomic
 Porch – home services platform
 RealNetworks – software
 Redfin – online real estate brokerage
 Smartsheet – SaaS work collaboration software
 Soundrangers – online sound effects and music
 Sporcle – online trivia
 Tableau Software – data visualization
 Thrift Books – retail
 Turbo (formerly Spoon) – application virtualization
 WhitePages.com – online people search, reverse phone & address lookup, and business search
 Zillow.com – real estate information service

Law
 Davis Wright Tremaine
 Lane Powell 
 Perkins Coie

Manufacturing
 Cutter & Buck – golf apparel
 Filson – outdoor apparel
 Pacific Coast Feather Company – bedding
 Tom Bihn - bags and luggage
 Vigor Shipyards – shipbuilding

Pet care
 Rover.com – dog boarding and dog walking

Property and architecture
 Bassetti Architects – architectural firm
 Callison – architectural firm
 Diamond Parking – parking lots
 Howard S. Wright Companies – construction
 John L. Scott – real estate brokerage
 Johnson Braund Design Group – design and architectural firm
 Miller Hull Partnership – architecture and planning
 Mithun – architecture, landscape architecture, interior design, planning and urban design
 NBBJ – architectural firm
 Olson Kundig Architects – architectural firm
 Plum Creek Timber – timber
 Sellen Construction
 Weber Thompson – architectural firm
 Windermere Real Estate – real estate brokerage

Public relations
 Waggener Edstrom – public relations
 Revolution Public Relations - public relations

Publishing
Bilingual Books, Inc. – foreign language books and computer software
Fantagraphics Books – comics and graphic novels
Mountaineers Books – non-fiction books
Sasquatch Books – non-fiction books

Record labels
 Barsuk Records
 Sub Pop
 Tooth & Nail Records

Retail
 Amazon
 Babeland (formerly Toys in Babeland) – sex toys
 Bartell Drugs
 Blue Nile Inc – diamonds
 Brooks Sports – athletic apparel
 Car Toys – automobile audio equipment and cell phones
 Cascade Designs – outdoor apparel 
 Cequint
 Indix – product intelligence database
 Julep – cosmetics and personal care
 K2 Sports – sporting goods and apparel
 NetMotion Wireless – Mobile VPN Solution
 Nordstrom – apparel
 The Omni Group – develops software for the Mac OS X platform
 Outdoor Research – apparel
 PCC Natural Markets – supermarket
 QFC – supermarket chain
 RealNetworks – Internet
 Rhapsody – online music service
 Sur La Table – cookware
 Tommy Bahama – apparel
 Zumiez – action sports
 Zulily – apparel and housewares

Sports, leisure and entertainment
 Professional Bowlers Association – sanctioning body for the sport of professional ten-pin bowling
 Puzzle Break – first American-based live escape room company

Transportation
 Aero Controls Inc.
 Alaska Airlines – major US airline
 Ambassadors International – cruise ships
 Convoy – trucking logistics software
 Expeditors International – logistics
 Holland America Line – cruise ships
 Saltchuk – transportation and logistics
 Windstar Cruises – cruise ships

Video games
 Arenanet – Guild Wars franchise
 Big Fish Games – casual games
 PopCap – casual games
 Sucker Punch Productions – Sly Cooper and Infamous franchise
 Undead Labs  – State of Decay games

Companies based in the Greater Seattle area 

Other large or well-known interstate or international companies popularly associated with Seattle are actually based in other Puget Sound cities: 
 Alaska Air Group, Alaska Airlines, and Horizon Air – SeaTac
 ArenaNet – Bellevue
 Blue Origin – Kent
 Bungie – Bellevue
 Classmates.com – Renton
 Clearwire – Bellevue
 Concur Technologies – Bellevue
 Costco – Issaquah (founded in Seattle)
 drugstore.com – Bellevue
 Eddie Bauer – Bellevue (founded in Seattle)
 eNom – Kirkland
 Expedia Group – Seattle (moved HQ from Bellevue to Seattle)
 Fluke Corporation – Everett
 Funko – Everett
 INRIX – Kirkland
 Intelius – Bellevue
 Kymeta – Redmond
 Microsoft – Redmond
 msnbc.com – Redmond
 MulvannyG2 Architecture – Bellevue
 Nintendo of America – Redmond
 Oberto Sausage Company – Kent
 Outerwall (formerly Coinstar) – Bellevue
 Paccar – Bellevue
 Philips – Bothell
 Premera Blue Cross – Mountlake Terrace
 Puget Sound Energy – Bellevue
 Raleigh USA – Kent
 REI – Kent (founded in Seattle)
 Savers/Value Village – Bellevue
 SOG Specialty Knives - Lynnwood
 Sucker Punch Productions – Bellevue
 T-Mobile US – Bellevue
 Talking Rain – Preston
 Valve – Bellevue
 Wizards of the Coast - Renton

Companies formerly headquartered in Seattle 
 Airborne Express (ground operations acquired by DHL, Plantation, Florida; air operations spun off as ABX Air, Wilmington, Ohio)
 Associated Grocers (acquired by Unified Western Grocers of Los Angeles)
 Boeing (now in Chicago, Illinois)
 The Bon Marché (owned by Macy's, Inc., Cincinnati, Ohio; name changed to Bon-Macy's in 2003; rebranded as Macy's in 2005)
 Cinnabon (acquired by FOCUS Brands, Inc., Atlanta, Georgia)
 Corixa – immunotherapeutics, closed in 2006
 Costco (now in Issaquah, Washington)
 Eddie Bauer (now in Bellevue, Washington)
 Ernst Home Centers (liquidated following unsuccessful bankruptcy filing in 1996)
 Frederick & Nelson (went out of business in 1992)
 Group Health Cooperative (acquired by Kaiser Permanente in 2017)
 Immunex (acquired by Amgen, Thousand Oaks, California)
 Muzak (now in Fort Mill, South Carolina)
 MyLackey.com (defunct)
 Rainier Brewing Company (now owned by Pabst Brewing Company, Milwaukee, Wisconsin)
 Red Robin Gourmet Burgers (now in Greenwood Village, Colorado)
 REI (now in Kent, Washington)
 Safeco (acquired by Liberty Mutual)
 Seafirst Bank (acquired by Bank of America)
 Shurgard Storage Centers (acquired by Public Storage)
 Speakeasy, Inc. (acquired by Best Buy in 2007 and merged with MegaPath in 2010)
 Surreal Software (acquired by Midway Games)
 United Airlines (now in Chicago)
 UPS (now in Sandy Springs, Georgia)
 Washington Mutual (failed in 2008, acquired by JPMorgan Chase)
 World Vision (now in Federal Way, Washington)
 Zulily (acquired by Liberty Interactive)

See also

References

External links
 Map of Seattle companies

Seattle
Companies